The Ugandan Ambassador in kenya is the official representative of the Government in Kampala to the Government of China.

List of representatives 

 China–Uganda relations

References 

China
Uganda
Ambassadors of Uganda to China